The men's 200 metre butterfly competition at the 2014 Pan Pacific Swimming Championships took place on August 21 at the Gold Coast Aquatic Centre.  The last champion was Michael Phelps of US.

This race consisted of four lengths of the pool, all lengths being in butterfly stroke.

Records
Prior to this competition, the existing world and Pan Pacific records were as follows:

Results
All times are in minutes and seconds.

Heats
The first round was held on August 21, at 11:47.

B Final 
The B final was held on August 21, at 20:59.

A Final 
The A final was held on August 21, at 20:59.

References

2014 Pan Pacific Swimming Championships